The Col de Pelouse is a mountain pass in the Alps on the border between France and Italy. On the northern (French) side, the pass leads into the valley of the Maurienne; on the southern (Italian) side, the Val di Susa. To its west rises the summit of Gardoria and to its east that of Aiguille de Scolette. It connects Avrieux in France with Bardonecchia in Italy.

A small barracks, Bivacco LXIII, lies in ruins on the Italian side. It was built in 1939 to house twenty soldiers. In 1940, during the Italian invasion of France, Italian troops passed through the Col de Pelouse. There was fighting just north of the pass on the French side.

For mountaineers, the Col de Pelouse is the easiest start point for climbing the Aiguille de Scolette or the Pointe de Paumont to the west.

Mountain passes of the Alps